Jessie Arnold (December 3, 1884 – May 5, 1955) was an American character and film actress. She was a character actress who appeared in more than 150 films from silent shorts to the early 1950s. She starred in the 1916 film Cross Purposes directed by William Worthington.

In 1916 she joined Universal City's stock company after touring Australia and "the Orient". She was in the serial Timothy Hobbs directed by Wallace Berry.

Death 
 
She died on May 5, 1955, aged 70 in Los Angeles, California, United States. She is interred in Hansville Cemetery.

Filmography 
Temptation, (1915) (uncredited)
Cross Purposes (1916) as Lisa
Tennessee's Pardner (1916) as Kate Kent
The Social Pirates (1916) 
Shoes (1916) as Lil, co-worker at store
Rough and Ready (1918) as Estelle Darrow
The Dark Mirror (1920) as Inez
Blackbirds (1920) as Suzanne 
The Idol of the North (1921) as Big Blond
Fury (1923) as Boy's Mother
Innocence (1923) as Wedding Guest (uncredited)
Playing with Souls (1925) as Louise 
The Hard Hombre (1931) as Mrs. Patton 
Behind Jury Doors (1932) as Ma Mauger 
Virtue (1932) as Landlady 
Whistlin' Dan (1932) as Horty "Whistlin' Dan" 
Hot Saturday (1932) as Aunt Minnie
 Police Car 17 (1933) as Neighbor
The Beloved Brat (1938) as Nurse (uncredited) 
Haunted House (1940) as Mrs. Emily Henshaw 
What's Buzzin', Cousin? (1943) as Mrs. Hillbilly
My Kingdom for a Cook (1943) as Mrs. Forsythe
Louisiana Hayride (1944) as Aunt Hepzibah (uncredited)
Sundown Valley (1944) as Mom Johnson
Lawless Empire (1945) as Mrs. Murphy 
Keeper of the Bees (1947) as Mrs. Postmaster
My Dog Rusty (1948) as Mrs. Stokes (uncredited) 
Air Hostess (1949) as Mrs. Peabody
The Traveling Saleswoman (1950) as Lady Customer (uncredited) 
When the Redskins Rode (1951) as Gossip at Wrestling Match

References

External links
Findagrave entry

20th-century American actresses
1884 births
1955 deaths